Tetraponera allaborans, is a species of ant of the subfamily Myrmicinae, which can be found in many Asian countries.

External links

 at antwiki.org
Animaldiversity.org
Itis.org

Pseudomyrmecinae
Hymenoptera of Asia